William Domville Stanley Monck (1763 – August 1840) was an Anglo-Irish politician. 

Monck was the Member of Parliament for Coleraine in the Irish House of Commons between 1795 and 1797, before representing Gorey from 1798 to 1799.

References

1763 births
1840 deaths
18th-century Anglo-Irish people
19th-century Anglo-Irish people
Irish MPs 1790–1797
Irish MPs 1798–1800
Members of the Parliament of Ireland (pre-1801) for County Londonderry constituencies
Members of the Parliament of Ireland (pre-1801) for County Wexford constituencies